The 2011 Ondrej Nepela Memorial was the 19th edition of an international figure skating competition annually held in Slovakia. It was held from September 28 to October 2, 2011 at the Ondrej Nepela Ice Rink in Bratislava. Skaters competed in the disciplines of men's singles, ladies' singles, pair skating, and ice dancing at the senior level.

Entries

Results

Men

Ladies

Pairs

Ice dancing

References

External links
 
 
 

Ondrej Nepela Memorial
Ondrej Nepela Memorial, 2011
Ondrej Nepela Memorial